Trancas is a studio album by the folk artist John Stewart, former member of the Kingston Trio. It was released in 1984 on Affordable Dreams. This album is produced by Stewart and he also plays all the instruments except for a set of electronic Oberheim DMX drums. The album was reissued on CD in 1988 with two extra tracks recorded in April 1988.

Track listing
All compositions by John Stewart, except where indicated.
Side one
 "It Ain't the Gold" – 2:57
 "Reasons to Rise" – 3:29
 "Pilots in Blue" – 3:16
 "Chasing Down the Rain" – 3:12
 "'Til the Lights Come Home" – 2:46
Side two
 "Bringing Down the Moon" – 3:03
 "All the Lights" – 3:26
 "Rocky Top" (Felice and Boudleaux Bryant) – 2:32
 "The American Way" – 4:08
 "The Chosen" – 3:37

CD Bonus Tracks
 "Heart of a Kid" – 3:25
 "Irresistible Targets"– 4:18

Personnel
 John Stewart - vocals, all instruments 
 Buffy Ford Stewart - background vocals
 Chuck McDermott - background vocals
 Teresa Tate - background vocals
 Nick Reynolds - background vocals

Additional personnel
 John Stewart - producer
 Carla Fredricks - engineer
 Fred Koch - second engineer
 Henry Diltz - photography

References

1984 albums
John Stewart (musician) albums
Albums recorded at Shangri-La (recording studio)